The 2012 FIG World Cup circuit in Rhythmic Gymnastics includes one category A event (Sofia) and six category B events. Apart from Corbeil-Essonnes (individuals only), all events include both, individual and group competitions, with all-around competitions serving as qualifications for the finals by apparatus.

With stopovers in Europe and Asia, the competitions took place March 16–18 in Kyiv (UKR), April 13–15 in Pesaro (ITA), April 28–29 in Penza (RUS), May 5–6 in Sofia (BUL), May 11–13 in Corbeil-Essonnes (FRA), May 18–20 in Tashkent (UZB) and July 13–15 in Minsk (BLR).

The world ranking points collected by the competitors at their best four World Cup events were added up to a total for each gymnast, and the top scorers in each event were crowned winners of the overall series at the final event in Minsk, Belarus.

Formats

Medal winners

All-around

Individual

Group all-around

Apparatus

Hoop

Ball

Clubs

Ribbon

5 balls

2 hoops and 3 ribbons

Overall medal table

See also
 2012 FIG Artistic Gymnastics World Cup series

References

Rhythmic Gymnastics World Cup
2012 in gymnastics